Allen Reynolds (born August 18, 1938) is an American record producer and songwriter who specializes in country music. He has been inducted into the Nashville Songwriters Hall of Fame and the Musicians Hall of Fame and Museum.

Biography

Early life and career 
Reynolds was born in North Little Rock, Arkansas, and grew up in Memphis, Tennessee. He started writing songs during his college years and eventually teamed up with Dickey Lee to form their own publishing and production company. They had a minor regional hit with the song "Dream Boy."

In the early 1960s, Reynolds most notably wrote the 1965 pop hit "Five O'Clock World" for the Vogues. Reynolds worked at Sun Records in Memphis, and he became good friends with Jack Clement, a leading producer and writer at the label.

Commercial success 
In the early 1970s, Reynolds' friend, producer and writer Jack Clement, left Memphis to start his own publishing company and record label in Nashville, JMI Records. Clement convinced Reynolds to sign on as vice-president. Reynolds built a roster of talented writers at the label, including Bob McDill (writer of the country standard "Amanda") and Don Williams. Reynolds went on to write and produce on Williams' first two albums, and was instrumental in helping Williams to launch his career.

When JMI Records closed in 1975, Reynolds continued to actively write and produce around Nashville, including Waylon Jennings' "Dreaming My Dreams with You." However, he achieved his greatest commercial success during this time working as writer and producer for Crystal Gayle. Some of their notable collaborations included "Wrong Road Again," "Somebody Loves You" and "Ready For the Times to Get Better." When Gayle left Decca records 1975, she signed with UA Records where she was teamed up with Reynolds, and he is credited with developing her signature soft rock sound.

Later career 
Allen Reynolds' songs have left a lasting legacy on the country music scene. Hal Ketchum covered the 1960s hit "Five O'Clock World" on his 1991 debut album Past the Point of Rescue, with Reynolds as co-producer alongside Jim Rooney, which became a Top 20 country single for Ketchum.

Reynolds has kept busy in the music industry working as a noted record producer. Reynolds produced many of Garth Brooks's hit albums. He has also produced albums for Kathy Mattea, Hal Ketchum, Emmylou Harris, George Hamilton IV and the O'Kanes.

Compositions

References 

Record producers from Arkansas
1938 births
Living people
People from North Little Rock, Arkansas